Michael Helm is a Canadian novelist. He was born 1961 in Eston, Saskatchewan, and received degrees in literature from the University of Saskatchewan and the University of Toronto.

His debut novel, The Projectionist (1997), was nominated for the Giller Prize and the Trillium Book Award. His second novel, In the Place of Last Things (2004) was a finalist for the regional Commonwealth Prize for Best Book and the Rogers Writers' Trust Fiction Prize. His 2010 novel Cities of Refuge was shortlisted for the Rogers Writers' Trust Fiction Prize, longlisted for the Giller Prize, and named a Globe and Mail Best Book of the Year and a Now Magazine Top Ten of 2010.

Helm's essays on fiction, poetry, and the visual arts have appeared in various magazines, including Brick, where he serves as an editor. Helm currently teaches in the Department of English at York University in Toronto.

Helm was awarded a Guggenheim Fellowship in 2019.

Bibliography
 The Projectionist - 1997
 In the Place of Last Things - 2004
 Cities of Refuge - 2010
 After James - 2016

References

Further reading
 Ana María Fraile-Marcos: The Politics of Art and Affect in Michael Helm's "Cities of Refuge", in Beyond "Understanding Canada". Transnational Perspectives on Canadian Literature. Ed. Melissa Tanti, Jeremy Haynes, Daniel Coleman, Lorraine York. University of Alberta Press, Edmonton 2017, pp 193 – 210

Canadian male novelists
Living people
Writers from Saskatchewan
University of Saskatchewan alumni
University of Toronto alumni
1961 births
Academics of the University of York
People from Eston, Saskatchewan
20th-century Canadian novelists
21st-century Canadian novelists
20th-century Canadian male writers
21st-century Canadian male writers